The 2001 NFL Europe season was the ninth season in 11 years of the American Football league that started out as the World League of American Football.

World Bowl IX
Berlin 24-17 Barcelona
Saturday, June 30, 2001 Amsterdam ArenA  Amsterdam, Netherlands

References 

 
2001 in American football
NFL Europe (WLAF) seasons